No. 669 Squadron RAF was a glider squadron of the Royal Air Force active during the Second World War.

History
No. 669 Squadron RAF was formed on 16 November 1944 at Bikram, Patna, India as a glider squadron, with the intention of being used for airborne operations by South East Asia Command. However, after a short period it was redesignated No. 671 Squadron RAF, due to an earlier mix-up of squadron designations and bases.
The squadron was reformed anew the next day, with the same role and at the right base, and continued to train, as part of No. 343 Wing RAF, until the surrender of Japan, when it became surplus to requirements. The squadron was disbanded on 10 November 1945 at Fatehjang, British India.

Present
The squadron today is represented by 669 Squadron of 9 Regiment, Army Air Corps.

Aircraft operated

Squadron bases

References

Notes

Bibliography

External links
 Squadron history for nos. 651–670 sqn at RAF Web

Aircraft squadrons of the Royal Air Force in World War II
669 Squadron